Misopates is a genus of the family Plantaginaceae, and is one of the groups of plants commonly known as 'snapdragons'. It has eight accepted species:
Misopates calycinum (Lange)  Rothm.
Misopates chrysothales (Font Quer) Rothm.
Misopates font-queri (Emb.) Ibn Tattou
Misopates marraicum D.A.Sutton
Misopates microcarpum (Pomel) D.A.Sutton
Misopates oranense (Faure) D.A.Sutton
Misopates orontium (L.) Raf.
Misopates salvagense D.A.Sutton

References 

 
Plantaginaceae genera
Taxa named by Constantine Samuel Rafinesque